E. C. Stoner may refer to:

 Edmund Clifton Stoner (1899–1968), British theoretical physicist
 Elmer Cecil Stoner (1897–1969), American artist and commercial illustrator